The 2013 Aberdeen Donside by-election is a by-election that was held for the Scottish Parliament constituency of Aberdeen Donside on Thursday 20 June, following the death from cancer of the constituency's MSP, Brian Adam.

The seat was created as Aberdeen North following the establishment of the Scottish Parliament in 1999. In the first election to the Scottish Parliament the seat was won by the Scottish Labour Party, but was gained by Brian Adam (who had contested, but lost, the seat in 1999) for the Scottish National Party in the next election. He held the seat in 2007 and 2011 with increased majorities. In the last election, Adam held the seat with a majority of 7,175 votes.

In the 2011 Scottish Parliament election, the SNP became the first ever majority government of the Scottish Parliament, winning 69 seats out of 129. Prior to Adam's death, however, the SNP only held a majority of one (following the election of Tricia Marwick as presiding officer and the departure of three other MSPs). This meant that if the SNP lost the by-election then the government would lose its overall majority.

SNP list MSP for the North-East region, Mark McDonald, resigned his seat to contest the constituency by-election. McDonald held the seat for the SNP, but with a significantly reduced majority on a lower turnout.

Election
Nine candidates contested the election, with their detail published on 17 May 2013.

Scottish Parliament Election result, 2011

See also
Aberdeen Donside, and its predecessor, Aberdeen North
Elections in Scotland
List of by-elections to the Scottish Parliament

References

Aberdeen Donside by-election
Aberdeen Donside by-election
2010s elections in Scotland
Aberdeen Donside 2013
Elections in Aberdeen
21st century in Aberdeen
Aberdeen Donside by-election